EP3 may refer to:

 EP3 (Basement Jaxx EP)
 EP3 (Kleptones EP)
 EP3 (Pixies EP)
 EP3 (Ringo Starr EP)
 EP03, a Swedish electric locomotive used by the Polish railway operator PKP
 Lockheed EP-3, an electronic surveillance turboprop aircraft
 Milwaukee Road class EP-3, a U.S. electric locomotive used by the railway operator Milwaukee Road 1919-1957
 Procyclin EP3, a trypanosome procyclin protein
 Prostaglandin receptor EP3
 The chassis code for the 2001-2005 Civic Si and Type R

See also 
 Episode III (disambiguation)
 III (Orbital EP)